The Housing, Town Planning, &c. Act 1909 (c. 44) was an Act of the Parliament of the United Kingdom which prevented the building of "back-to-back" houses. The act also meant local authorities must introduce systems of town planning and meant homes had to be built to certain legal standards.

See also

Liberal reforms
New towns movement
Town and country planning in the United Kingdom

Bibliography
 Full text
 Handbook to the Housing and Town Planning Act, 1909 by W. Thompson.
 Housing, town planning, etc., act, 1909, a practical + guide, by E.G. Bentley, LL.B., and S. Pointon Taylorwith a foreword by Raymond Unwin, 1911.
 Housing and Town Planning in Great Britain, including the Housing, Town Planning Act, by http://codesproject.asu.edu/node/90, 191o

References

Housing in the United Kingdom
United Kingdom Acts of Parliament 1909
United Kingdom planning law